Pariwana (Quechua for flamingo, Hispanicized spelling Parihuana) is a  mountain in the Andes of Peru. It is located in the Puno Region, Lampa Province, on the border of the districts of Palca and Vilavila. Pariwana lies north of  Qillqa.

References

Mountains of Peru
Mountains of Puno Region